The Departmental Council of Seine-et-Marne is the deliberative assembly of the Seine-et-Marne department in the region of Île-de-France. It consists of 46 members (general councilors) from 23 cantons and its headquarters are in Melun.

The President of the General Council is Jean-François Parigi.

Vice-Presidents 
The President of the Departmental Council is assisted by 13 vice-presidents chosen from among the departmental advisers. Each of them has a delegation of authority.

References

See also 

 Seine-et-Marne
 General councils of France

Seine-et-Marne
Seine-et-Marne